Rygar is a  side-scrolling platform game created by Tecmo in 1986 and originally released for arcades in Japan as . The player assumes the role of a "Legendary Warrior", battling through a hostile landscape. The main feature of gameplay is the use of a weapon called the "Diskarmor", a shield with a long chain attached to it.

A remake, Rygar: The Legendary Adventure, was released in 2002. , Rygar and its remake sold a combined  copies worldwide.

Plot
The arcade game begins with the following introduction:

In the arcade version's story, the year 19XX sees the rise of dread creatures, not seen since before the Common Era, led by Ligar. Dominating the world, Ligar and his forces oppress humanity. The only thing that preserves humanity's will to survive is a prophecy that Ligar's rule will be opposed by the return of a long-dead warrior of Argos. That warrior does return to the world of the living, and he alone can save humanity.

Information gleaned from console manuals reveals that the evil being Ligar has taken over the land of Argool, and Rygar, a dead warrior who has risen from his grave, must use his Diskarmor to stop him. In console versions clues and limited dialogue are given in the form of large, sage-like men encountered in green stone temples throughout the game.

In the Japanese original, references to "Ligar" and "Rygar" are one and the same because the Roman syllables "Li" and "Ry" come from the same Japanese character. In this version, the hero is only referred to as "The Legendary Warrior", while both "Rygar" and "Ligar" refer to the main villain.

Ports
The game was ported to the X68000, Commodore 64, Master System (Japan only, and renamed ), ZX Spectrum, Amstrad CPC and the Atari Lynx.  The 8-bit versions were produced by Probe Software. In the Atari Lynx version some rounds are different, and there are only 23 rounds.

Rygar is included included in a compilation of games called Tecmo Classic Arcade for the Xbox. The arcade version was re-released on the Wii Virtual Console.

Related Famicom/NES game
It was released on April 14, 1987, in Japan and later that year in the United States for the NES. A European release came in 1990.

The player sends the title character through a number of fantastic settings with the ultimate goal of defeating the evil King Ligar in order to restore peace to the realm of Argool (Argus in the Japanese version). To accomplish this goal, the Warrior must visit five Indora gods who present him with essential items needed for completion of the game. Each of the Indora gods is located in a different realm, and is almost always guarded by a boss. The player can choose the order in which some stages are played, but since certain items are required to reach new areas, choices are somewhat limited. After playing through the five major realms of the game, he must journey to King Ligar's flying castle for the final confrontation.

The main character, his weapon, and many of the enemies remain the same, but the gameplay  is quite different. While the arcade version is more of a standard side-scrolling action title, the NES's Rygar is an open-ended action-adventure game like Metroid (see Metroidvania), which was also released at the time. At the beginning of the game, Rygar has access to some of the worlds, but as the game progresses, new areas open up as the result of finding items such as the grappling hook, crossbow, and wind pulley, which lets him cross previously impassable obstacles. The NES version of Rygar was also more of an action role-playing game with a nonlinear open world map in Garloz. It was particularly notable for its permanent power-up mechanic, which at the time blurred the line between the power-ups used in action-adventures and the experience points used in RPGs.

This version of Rygar did not allow for game saves as it lacked a password feature and the cartridge did not contain a battery. It did however have unlimited continues.

The American NES version replaced some of the soundtracks from its Famicom counterpart but is otherwise graphically identical, save for the title screen and language. The music for both the NES or Famicom versions was composed by Michiharu Hasuya who would later reuse one of Rygar's tracks  on the title screen of Dr. Jekyll and Mr. Hyde.

Bug in the PAL Version
The PAL version of the NES game contains a computer error which inadvertently increased (substantially) the difficulty in the final portions of the game, particularly in beating the final boss. The PAL version limited the player's tone and last stats to 1023 points instead of 4095, which meant that there was less maximum life and noticeably less damage to enemies.

Reception

In Japan, Game Machine listed Rygar on their July 1, 1986 issue as being the sixth most-successful table arcade unit of the month. It became Japan's seventh highest-grossing table arcade game during the latter half of 1986.

Rygar received positive reviews. Allgame editor Michael W. Dean said of the NES version that "(the) game features excellent control and pacing, the freedom of nonlinear level design, good graphics, a fabulous soundtrack, and one of the coolest weapons that any videogame hero has ever wielded". Peter Tieryas commended the game for its expansive world and non-linear gameplay relative to the standard for video games at the time of its release. In contrast, he lamented the lack of passwords or game saves available, though the game did feature unlimited continues.

Lynx
STart said of the Lynx version that the "simple game" was only recommended to "jump-and-shoot arcade enthusiasts". CVG Magazine reviewed the Lynx version in their March 1991 issue calling the game "dull" and only giving 46 out of 100. Julian Boardman of Raze Magazine reviewed the game in their April 1991 issue and liked "some superb backgrounds" the "wide variety of gruesome monsters" with "enough depth for most gamesters". He also noted the game lacked a certain amount of challenge, giving a final score of 81%.

Robert A. Jung review was published to IGN, in his final verdict he wrote; "Rygar for the Lynx is a "typical" game, neither extremely outstanding nor truly disappointing. While fans of the arcade game will find slight differences, it's close enough to be familiar (especially since the only other adaptation was a vastly different game for the Nintendo). Though there are only 23 levels, the lack of a level skip and game continues means this is an average-difficulty endurance contest which will take some time to finish." Giving a final score of 7 out of 10.

Legacy

In 2002, a remake titled Rygar: The Legendary Adventure was released by Tecmo for PlayStation 2. It features a transition to 3-D graphics and portions of the environment are destructible. It was released to generally positive reviews. On May 11, 2007, a Wii port was announced at Tecmo's "Nite Out 07" event, eventually released on January 28, 2009 in North America.

An unofficial port of Rygar was released for Amiga AGA machines in 2019.

References

External links

Hardcore Gaming 101 Articles on the Rygar series

Rygar at Arcade Archives Page
The Legend of Argus: The Complete History of Rygar, a history book about Rygar

1986 video games
Amstrad CPC games
Arcade video games
Atari Lynx games
Commodore 64 games
Master System games
Mobile games
Nintendo Entertainment System games
Nintendo Switch games
NuFX games
PlayChoice-10 games
PlayStation 4 games
X68000 games
Tecmo games
Virtual Console games
ZX Spectrum games
Action role-playing video games
Platform games
Metroidvania games
Video games based on Greek mythology
Video games developed in Japan
Nintendo Switch Online games
Hamster Corporation games